That's You! is a 2017 party game developed by Wish Studios and published by Sony Interactive Entertainment. The game is a PlayStation 4 exclusive and was the inaugural title of Sony's audience-widening PlayLink range.

Gameplay 

That's You!, as with all titles on Sony's PlayLink range, allows players to use their phones and tablet devices as controllers, via a companion app, and connect to the PlayStation 4 through the host Wi-Fi network.

For 2-6 players, it plays out as a fictional party, hosted by a southern American narrator, who takes the group through a succession of themed social situations, asking them questions and setting them challenges to find out how well they know one another.

During the game's set-up players are asked to choose a playing card (based on Jungian archetypes) and take a selfie, to which numerous filters can be applied. The selfies can be retaken at any point and form an integral part of the gameplay.

To score, players must vote on who they think best answers the question through secret ballots on their phones. As the questions are subjective and there is no correct answer, points are awarded by voting consensus, with the scores increasing relative to the number of players in agreement. The game then elaborates by focusing on a selected individual and getting the players to draw, write, and perform challenges based on their knowledge of them. These rounds are similarly scored by consensus.

Question and Challenge Types

3-6 Player 

Each round begins by placing the group in a hypothetical situation based in one of the game’s ten themed locations.

They then get asked a variety of the following question types:

Question Game – ‘Who’s most likely’ type questions, with players voting on who they think it best applies to. Questions are targeted at specific archetypes to ensure that the game focuses on a variety of player, not just ‘the biggest personality in the room’. For example:

(at a birthday party), “Who’d blow out someone else’s candles?” (Joker)

(on a first date) “Who’d use a two-for-one voucher on a first date?” (Everyman)

Picture Game - Based on the voting behaviour for the Question Game, the game selects a player to be the focal point for the rest of the round. The group are then given a selection of four images and asked which one would most apply to the player in focus.

Mimic Game - The group is shown an image and are challenged to take a selfie resembling it. The players then vote on the best likeness.

Photo Game - The group are requested to take a photo of someone in the room. They are then given a drawing challenge using the image as the backdrop.

Word Game - Players are given an incomplete sentence and asked to finish the phrase in the style of the player in focus.

Drawing Game - The players are all given an image which they must embellish to make it specific to the player selected for the focus round.

Final Game - For the game’s finale, players are each asked to take a selfie in a set pose. These are then passed from player to player in a round robin format, for each to embellish, or undermine, in accordance to the set challenge, much in the vein of the classic paper game Exquisite corpse. For example: “Draw [player 1] as a zombie”

2 Player 

In 2 player mode the game is scored cooperatively and consists of two focus rounds, one for each player.

They are asked 3 Decision Game questions in a brief narrative thread of increasing escalation, a Drawing Game challenge and a Mimic Game challenge.

Decision Game - One of the players is placed in the focus area and both players are asked how they would react in a given hypothetical situation. For example:  

“[player one] is on a losing streak in a casino and finds a wallet on the floor. Would they…”

“Set off towards the front desk to hand it in” or “Keep it and have some fun.”

Based on their response they are asked two follow-up questions of an increasingly farcical nature.

App Game 
The That’s You! app features a standalone multiplayer ‘Pass It On’ game, similar to the Final Game, in which a player is asked to take a selfie and embellish it using the app’s art tools, according to a set challenge. After 10 seconds they are prompted to hand the device over to another player to further embellish or undermine. The device is exchanged until the picture is considered complete.

User Generated Content 
Players can create their own content for That’s You!, with the option of either writing their own Question Game text questions, or completing an app-based picture challenge, which the game then converts into a photo-based Question Game asset.

Art Style 
The game has been praised for its striking ‘American indie movie’ themed art style, led by Art Director Paul Abbott and film graphic designer Annie Atkins, who has worked on Wes Anderson’s The Grand Budapest Hotel.

Reception 

That's You! received "Mixed or average" reviews from 27 critics on Metacritic. GamePro awarded the game 78%.

The game won the award for "Casual/Social Game" at The Independent Game Developers' Association Awards 2017, whereas its other nominations were for "Game by a Small Studio" and the "Creativity and Heritage Award". It was also nominated for "Best Family/Social Game" at the 2017 Game Critics Awards, and for "Gameplay Innovation" at the 2018 Develop Awards.

References

External links 
 

2017 video games
PlayStation 4 games
PlayStation 4-only games
Video games developed in the United Kingdom
Party video games
Quiz video games
Multiplayer video games
Sony Interactive Entertainment games